The 1968 Kansas Jayhawks football team represented the University of Kansas in the Big Eight Conference during the 1968 NCAA University Division football season. In their second season under head coach Pepper Rodgers, the Jayhawks compiled a 9–2 record (6–1 against conference opponents), tied with Oklahoma for the Big Eight Conference championship, lost to Penn State in the 1969 Orange Bowl, and outscored opponents by a combined total of 394 to 190. They played their home games at Memorial Stadium in Lawrence, Kansas. a big upset at home against the unranked Oklahoma sooners 27-23.

The team's statistical leaders included Bobby Douglass with 1,316 passing yards, John Riggins with 866 rushing yards and George McGowan with 592 receiving yards. John Zook was the team captain.

Quarterback Bobby Douglass finished 7th in Heisman Trophy voting receiving 9 1st place votes.

The Jayhawks wouldn’t beat Nebraska again until 2005, and it remains the last time they won in Lincoln. 

The Jayhawks were Big 8 co-champions. It remains, as of the 2020 season, the last conference championship Kansas has won.

Schedule

Roster

Rankings

Game summaries

at Nebraska

Oklahoma

vs. Penn State (Orange Bowl)

References

Kansas
Kansas Jayhawks football seasons
Big Eight Conference football champion seasons
Kansas Jayhawks football